3-Ureidopropionic acid, also called N-carbamoyl-beta-alanine, is an intermediate in the metabolism of uracil.  It is a urea derivative of beta-alanine.

References

Propionic acids
Ureas